Xestoleberididae is a family of ostracods belonging to the order Podocopida.

Genera:
 Castanoleberis Hu & Tao, 2008
 Foveoleberis Malz, 1980
 Hedlandella Mckenzie, 1989
 Microxestoleberis Mueller, 1894
 Ornatoleberis Keij, 1975
 Paraxestoleberis Warne, Whatley & Blagden, 2006
 Platyleberis Bonaduce & Danielopol, 1988
 Prunicythere Hu & Tao, 2008
 Pulaviella Szczechura, 1965
 Semixestoleberis Hartmann, 1962
 Tanchuanoleberis Hu & Tao, 2008
 Uroleberis Triebel, 1958
 Xestoleberis Sars, 1866

References

Podocopida
Ostracod families